Fort Yukon (Gwichyaa Zheh in Gwich'in) is a city in the Yukon-Koyukuk Census Area in the U.S. state of Alaska, straddling the Arctic Circle. The population, predominantly Gwich'in Alaska Natives, was 583 at the 2010 census, down from 595 in 2000.

Fort Yukon was the hometown of the late Alaska Congressman Don Young. Served by Fort Yukon Airport, it is also known for having the record highest temperature in Alaska.

History
This area north of the Arctic Circle was occupied for thousands of years by cultures of indigenous people and in historic times by the Gwich’in people.  means "House on the Flats" in Gwichʼin.

What became the village of Fort Yukon developed from a trading post, Fort Yukon, established by Alexander Hunter Murray of the Hudson's Bay Company, on 25 June 1847. Murray drew numerous sketches of fur trade posts and of people and wrote the Journal of the Yukon, 1847–48, which gave valuable insight into the culture of the Gwich’in at the time. While the post was in Russian America, the Hudson's Bay Company continued to trade there until the American traders expelled it in 1869, following the Alaska Purchase when the Alaska Commercial Company took over the post.

During the Klondike Gold Rush, in the winter of 1897–1898, Fort Yukon received two hundred prospectors from Dawson City, which was short of supply. A post office was established on July 12, 1898, with John Hawksly as its first postmaster. The settlement suffered over the following decades as a result of several infectious disease epidemics and a 1949 flood.

During the 1950s, the United States Air Force established a base and radar station at Fort Yukon; the town was officially incorporated in 1959. Since the late 20th century, due in part to its extreme northerly location and its proximity to Fairbanks, it has become a minor tourist destination.

Geography

Fort Yukon is located at  (66.567586, -145.256327).

Climate
Fort Yukon has a strongly continental subarctic climate (Köppen climate classification: Dfc). In the summer Fort Yukon has midnight sun and in December the sun appears for only a few hours each day.

Summer temperatures are exceptionally high for such a northerly area, being far warmer than the tree line threshold. The highest temperature ever recorded in Alaska occurred in Fort Yukon on June 27, 1915, when it reached . This was also the highest temperature recorded north of the Arctic Circle until June 20, 2020, when it was finally exceeded by a  reading at Verkhoyansk, a location similarly known for its extremely continental climate.

Demonstrating the bipolar nature of its climate, Fort Yukon is also subject to severe winters, being less influenced by chinook winds than areas to the west—the winter season absolute maximum being  colder than in Fairbanks.

The city is among the best places in the world for observing the Aurora Borealis.

Demographics

Fort Yukon first appeared on the 1880 U.S. Census as an unincorporated village of 109 residents. Of those, 107 were members of the Tinneh Tribe and 2 were Whites. It did not appear on the 1890 census, but has returned in every successive census since 1900. It formally incorporated in 1959, the year Alaska became a state.

As of the census of 2000, there were 595 people, 225 households, and 137 families residing in the city. The racial makeup of the city was 86.05% Native American, 10.76% White, 0.17% Black or African American, 0.17% Asian, and 0.17% from other races, and 2.69% from two or more races. Hispanic or Latino of any race were 1.34% of the population.

There were 225 households, out of which 36.0% had children under the age of 18 living with them, 25.8% were married couples living together, 23.1% had a female householder with no husband present, and 39.1% were non-families. 34.2% of all households were made up of individuals, and 5.8% had someone living alone who was 65 years of age or older. The average household size was 2.62 and the average family size was 3.37.

In the city, the population was spread out, with 33.4% under the age of 18, 10.3% from 18 to 24, 27.4% from 25 to 44, 22.0% from 45 to 64, and 6.9% who were 65 years of age or older. The median age was 32 years. For every 100 females, there were 112.5 males. For every 100 females age 18 and over, there were 111.8 males.

The median income for a household in the city was $29,375, and the median income for a family was $32,083. Males had a median income of $25,000 versus $27,813 for females. The per capita income for the city was $13,360. About 18.0% of families and 18.5% of the population were below the poverty line, including 14.3% of those under age 18 and 3.5% of those age 65 or over.

Education
Yukon Flats School District operates the Fort Yukon School, serving Fort Yukon.

The University of Alaska (Fairbanks) operates a rural campus facility called the Yukon Flats Center.

Notable people
 Hudson Stuck (1863–1920), Episcopal priest, social reformer, mountain climber (buried there in the native cemetery)
 Hannah Paul Solomon (1908–2011), first woman elected mayor of Fort Yukon
 Jonathon Solomon (1932–2006), Goldman Environmental Prize recipient for his efforts to protect the Arctic National Wildlife Refuge
 Don Young (1933–2022), longest-serving Republican member of the U.S. House of Representatives and of Congress in history
 Clarence Alexander (born 1939), First Chief of Fort Yukon
 Woodie Salmon (born 1952), politician, Representative, Alaska State House of Representatives, 2004–2010, former Chief, Chalkyitsik, Council Member, Fort Yukon Mayor, Fort Yukon
 Velma Wallis (born 1960), Native American writer

References

External links

 

 
1847 establishments in the British Empire
Cities in Alaska
Cities in Yukon–Koyukuk Census Area, Alaska
Gwich'in
Hudson's Bay Company forts in the United States
Populated places established in 1847
Populated places of the Arctic United States
Yukon River